Giuseppe Antonio Ghedini (1707 – June 5, 1791) was an Italian painter of the Baroque period, mainly active in Ferrara.

Biography
Born in Ficarolo in the province of Rovigo. He trained with Giacomo Parolini. He became professor of painting at the Academy of Fine Arts of Ferrara.

He painted for the main church in Mirandola and the church in Vallalta. He painted a cycle of paintings about the Mysteries of the Rosary, once were around the altar dedicated to the Madonna del Rosario in the church of San Materno Vescovo in Melara. These are now found in Rovigo. He also painted two altarpieces destroyed in an 1851 fire at the church. Giuseppe's brother was a prelate in the town. He painted two altarpieces for Santa Maria in Vado: a Il mendico cacciato dal convitto di nozze and a Sacrifice of Melchisedec

He painted many portraits, including Girolamo Baruffaldi (Cento, 1736), Ferrante Borsetti, Pope Benedict XIV, and Bishop B. Barberini. Francesco Zucchi engraved many of his portraits. Ghedini helped illustrated the front page of an edition of Gerusalemme Liberata by Ricciardetto di N. Fortiguerri, also engraved by Zucchi.

References

External links

1707 births
1791 deaths
People from the Province of Ferrara
18th-century Italian painters
Italian male painters
Painters from Ferrara
Italian Baroque painters
18th-century Italian male artists